"That's On Me" is a song by American rapper Yella Beezy, released independently on October 31, 2017 as the second single from his second mixtape Lite Work, Vol. 2 (2017). The song is considered his breakout hit. Following its peak at number 56 on the Billboard Hot 100, Beezy was signed to L.A. Reid's Hitco record label.

The official remix of the song was released on October 26, 2018. It features vocals from American rappers 2 Chainz, T.I., Rich the Kid, Jeezy, Boosie Badazz and Trapboy Freddie, and appears on Yella Beezy's third mixtape Ain't No Goin' Bacc (2018).

Charts

Weekly charts

Year-end charts

Certifications

References

2017 singles
2017 songs
Yella Beezy songs